De scriptoribus ecclesiasticis ("On ecclesiastical writers") is the title of many works:

 De viris illustribus, sive de scriptoribus ecclesiasticis (5th century), by Jerome
 De viris illustribus, sive de scriptoribus ecclesiasticis (5th century), by Gennadius of Massilia
 De viris illustribus, sive de scriptoribus ecclesiasticis (11th century), by Sigebert of Gembloux
 De luminaribus Ecclesiae, sive de scriptoribus ecclesiasticis (12th century), by Honorius Augustodunensis
 De scriptoribus ecclesiasticis (12th century), by Wolfger of Prüfening
 Liber de scriptoribus ecclesiasticis (1494), by Johannes Trithemius
 De scriptoribus ecclesiasticis (1613), by Robert Bellarmine